Marly de Oliveira (c. 1938 – June 1, 2007) was a Brazilian poet who wrote eight volumes of poetry in a career lasting 40 years. Her best known work is "O Mar de Permeio" or "The Sea Between Us", a collection of poems about worry and despair, which won the Jabuti Prize in 1998. De Oliveira was a professor of Hispanic and Italian literature. She was married to fellow Brazilian poet João Cabral de Melo Neto and she had two surviving daughters at the time of her death resulting from multiple organ failure. De Oliveira was a member of the Brazilian Academy of Letters.

References

2007 deaths
Brazilian academics
Members of the Brazilian Academy of Letters
Year of birth uncertain
20th-century Brazilian poets
Brazilian women poets
20th-century Brazilian women writers